Coelobathra is a genus of moths of the family Crambidae. It contains only one species, Coelobathra ochromorpha, which is found in Australia.

References

Pyraustinae
Crambidae genera
Monotypic moth genera
Taxa named by Alfred Jefferis Turner